Aechmea dactylina is a plant species in the genus Aechmea. This species is native to Costa Rica, Nicaragua, Panama, Colombia and Ecuador.

References

External links

dactylina
Flora of Central America
Flora of South America
Plants described in 1879
Taxa named by John Gilbert Baker